San Juan Aviation is an Air Charter airline company that operates regularly scheduled flights from Luis Muñoz Marín International Airport in Carolina, Puerto Rico. The airline specializes in flights to destinations in the Dominican Republic.

Code data
IATA Code: JI

Fleet details
 2 - Beechcraft King Air

References

Airlines of Puerto Rico
Puerto Rican brands